Neil Sedaka In The Studio, 1958-1962, alternatively titled Neil Sedaka: The RCA Sessions, 1958-1962, is a 2013 album containing 70 minutes' worth of outtakes from Neil Sedaka's recording sessions during the early years of his career with RCA Victor Records. It was released in Europe on the Astro Records label.

Track listing
 "The Diary" (Version 2), Rehearsal & Takes 1-3 (October 30, 1958)
 "The Diary (Version 2)", Take 4 (October 30, 1958)
 "No Vacancy" Takes 1-3 (October 30, 1958)
 "No Vacancy" Insert & Overdub (October 30, 1958)
 "All I Need Is You" Takes 1-3 (October 27, 1958)
 "Oh! Carol" Rehearsal & Take 1 (July 31, 1959)
 "Oh! Carol" Takes 2, 3 & 4 (July 31, 1959)
 "One-Way Ticket (To The Blues)" Takes 1-4 (July 31, 1959)
 "One-Way Ticket (To The Blues)" Take 6 (July 31, 1959)
 "Calendar Girl" Rehearsals (October 24, 1960)
 "Calendar Girl" Takes 1-3 (October 24, 1960)
 "Calendar Girl" Takes 4-7 (October 24, 1960)
 "Calendar Girl" Take 8 (October 24, 1960)
 "Next Door to an Angel" Takes 1-5 (October 1962)
 "Next Door to an Angel" Take 6 (October 1962)

Neil Sedaka compilation albums
2013 compilation albums